Cecilia Inés Méndez (born April 21, 1986 in Buenos Aires, Argentina) is an Argentine fashion model who has been in advertising campaigns for Marithé et François Girbaud, Charles David, and Bottega Veneta.

Career
Méndez's modeling career began when an agent discovered Cecilia walking down the street in Buenos Aires. She's been in the New York, Milan, and Paris fashion shows walking for Alexander McQueen, Bottega Veneta, Burberry Prorsum, Chanel, Christian Dior, Dries van Noten, Issey Miyake, Marc Jacobs, Oscar de la Renta, Yohji Yamamoto and others.

Personal
Méndez is of Spanish, German, and Italian descent. She resides in New York City.

References

External links 

 
 
 
 Cecilia Mendez profile at Models.com
 Cecilia Mendez on Myspace

Argentine female models
Living people
1986 births
Argentine people of Spanish descent
Argentine people of Italian descent
Argentine people of German descent
21st-century Argentine women